Marshall Goldberg (October 24, 1917 – April 3, 2006) was a National Football League (NFL) All-Pro  American football player.  He played college football as a halfback and fullback at the University of Pittsburgh.  At Pittsburgh, Goldberg was twice recognized as a consensus All-American, and played on two national championship teams under head coach Jock Sutherland.  Goldberg played for the Chicago Cardinals of the NFL for eight seasons between 1939 and 1948, with an interruption during World War II, and was a four-time All-Pro.  He was inducted into the College Football Hall of Fame in 1958.

Early life
Goldberg was born in Elkins, West Virginia, to a Jewish family. Goldberg's father Sol emigrated from Romania to Cumberland, Maryland, where he met and married Rebecca (Becky) Fram, daughter of a Cumberland shoemaker. Family lore has it that Sol Goldberg and Becky's brother, Benjamin, were friends.

Goldberg attended Elkins High School, where he was captain of the basketball, football, and track teams.  He was named All-State in all three sports.

College career
At the University of Pittsburgh, under coach Jock Sutherland, he led the Pitt Panthers to back-to-back national championships in 1936 and 1937. Goldberg's 1936 team won the 1937 Rose Bowl.  He finished third in the Heisman Trophy voting in 1937 and was runner-up for the Heisman in 1938. He was also an All-American in both 1937 and 1938, first as a halfback and then as a fullback. During his Pitt career he amassed 1,957 rushing yards, a school record that stood until 1974 when Tony Dorsett surpassed it.     Goldberg was part of Pitt's legendary Dream Backfield along with Dick Cassiano, John 'Chick' Chickerneo, & Curly Stebbins.  Some experts consider Pitt's Dream Backfield superior to the more famous Four Horsemen of Notre Dame.

Professional career
After college Goldberg played in the National Football League for the Chicago Cardinals from 1939 to 1943, interrupted by his service during World War II in the United States Navy, then again from 1946 to 1948.  The team won the NFL Championship in 1947, and won their division the following year. Goldberg was a four-time NFL All-Pro.

Goldberg joined the Navy in 1943 and spent two years in the South Pacific rising to the rank of lieutenant.  He worked in the insurance industry after his football career ended. In 1965, he took over a machine parts company, Marshall Goldberg Machine Tools Ltd., of Rosemont, Illinois.

Honors and death
Goldberg was elected by Sports Illustrated to the 1930s College Football Team of the Decade. In 1958, he was enshrined in the College Football Hall of Fame and several other halls of fame, including that of the City of Pittsburgh, the West Virginia Sports Writers Hall of Fame, and the National Jewish Sports Hall of Fame.

Goldberg died in 2006 at age 88 at a nursing home in Chicago.  Following his death, his daughter, Ellen Tullos, and his widow, Rita Goldberg, helped to set up The Marshall Goldberg Traumatic Brain Injury Fund at The University of Illinois at Chicago. Goldberg had sustained a number of concussions during his career, which the family felt contributed to difficulties later in his life. This fund has been instrumental in bringing attention to the problem of head injury in athletes.  On August 24, 2007, Goldberg and Emmitt Thomas were selected by the Pro Football Hall of Fame's Seniors Committee as finalists for election into the Hall of Fame with the Class of 2008 but was not selected.  The Professional Football Researchers Association named Goldberg to the PFRA Hall of Very Good Class of 2007.

His #99 jersey number was retired by the Arizona Cardinals, and he is in the Arizona Cardinals Ring of Honor.  On March 2, 2021, Goldberg's daughter gave her blessing to former Houston Texans defensive end J. J. Watt to wear the previously retired #99.

See also
List of select Jewish football players

References

Additional sources
 
 
 International Jewish Sports Hall of Fame profile

External links
 
 

1917 births
2006 deaths
All-American college football players
American football running backs
Chicago Cardinals players
Pittsburgh Panthers football players
College Football Hall of Fame inductees
United States Navy SEALs personnel
United States Navy personnel of World War II
People from Elkins, West Virginia
Players of American football from West Virginia
American people of Romanian-Jewish descent
Jewish American sportspeople
United States Navy officers
20th-century American Jews
21st-century American Jews
National Football League players with retired numbers